The Pagan Manifesto is the eighth studio album released by the Italian folk/power metal band, Elvenking. The album is a return to the band's pagan roots and sees a return to their original idea, concept and sound both lyrically and musically.

Track listing

Personnel 
Damnagoras -  Vocals
Aydan - Guitars
Rafahel - Guitars
Jakob - Bass
Symohn - Drums
Lethien - Violin

Guest musicians
 Amanda Somerville (Kiske/Somerville) – Vocals on "King of the Elves"
 Jarpen – Harsh Vocals/Growls on "Witches Gather"
 Maurizio (Folkstone) - Bagpipes, Tin and Low Whistles
Whisperwind (Isabella Tuni) - Vocals on "Witches Gather"

References

External links 
 

Elvenking (band) albums
2014 albums
AFM Records albums